The Food Network & Cooking Channel South Beach Wine & Food Festival is an annual five-day event in Miami Beach, Lincoln Road, typically in mid-February. The event showcases wine, spirits, chefs, and culinary personalities. The five-day event consists of dinners, wine seminars, tasting and demos, brunches and lunches, walk-around tastings, family events, fitness, and late-night parties. The event is hosted by Florida International University.

2021 sees this festival move to May.

See also
Boston wine festival
Naples Grape Festival
North Carolina Wine Festival
San Diego Bay Wine & Food Festival
Simply Wine Festival
Tallahassee Wine and Food Festival
Temecula Valley Balloon & Wine Festival

References

External links
South Beach Wine and Food Festival

Food Network South Beach Wine and Food Festival
Festivals in Miami
Food and drink festivals in the United States
Wine festivals in the United States
1994 establishments in Florida
Festivals established in 1994